Timothy O'Sullivan may refer to:
 Timothy H. O'Sullivan (c. 1840–1882), American photographer known for his work on the American Civil War and the Western United States
 Timothy O'Sullivan (Fianna Fáil politician) (1899–1971), Irish Fianna Fáil politician, TD for Cork West 1937–1954, Senator 1954–1969
 Timothy O'Sullivan (Irish nationalist politician) (1879–1950), Member of Parliament for East Kerry 1910–1918
 Timmy O'Sullivan (1939–1984), Irish Gaelic footballer